John Edward Wiersema (1955-2018) was the interim Auditor General of Canada. He was appointed in May 2011 by the Prime Minister as for a mandate of six months after Sheila Fraser retired from the position.

Prior to his appointment, Wiersema was Deputy Auditor General.

Wiersema was born in Winnipeg, graduated from Carleton University in Commerce and became an accountant in 1981. 
Married to Marilyn Cassie Hut in 1979 and died in Ottawa.

References

Canadian accountants
Canadian civil servants
Living people
Canadian auditors
1955 births